"I Was Born to Love You" is a 1985 song by Freddie Mercury, and was released as a single and on the Mr. Bad Guy album. After Mercury's death, Queen re-worked this song for their album Made in Heaven in 1995, by having the other members play their instrumental parts over the original track, transforming the song from a disco song to a rock song. The Queen version from the Made in Heaven album also includes samples of Mercury's ad-lib vocals taken from "A Kind of Magic" and from "Living on My Own".

The song received its live debut on the 2005 tour of Japan, given by Queen + Paul Rodgers. Brian May and Roger Taylor performed the song acoustically. The song was also performed during the concerts given by Queen + Adam Lambert in South Korea and Japan, which was the first time that a full live band was used for the performance.

Music videos
The video for the original Freddie Mercury version of the song was directed by David Mallet and filmed at the now demolished Limehouse Studios, London. The video was choreographed by Arlene Phillips and shows Freddie singing in front of a wall of mirrors, then running through a house with a woman (Debbie Ash of Hot Gossip), before dancing on a podium.

The video for the version used on Made in Heaven was directed by Richard Heslop for the British Film Institute, and included on Made in Heaven: The Films. It shows inhabitants of a block of council flats. Couples kiss, kids play, and teenagers steal and destroy a car in a monochrome film. The audio also uses the vinyl edit. However, the reception on this music video was poor, it wasn't liked by fans.

For the 2004 re-release (see below), a video was created mixing footage of Mercury's original solo video intercut with footage of Queen performing live at Wembley Stadium, plus his solo video "Living on My Own". This video is included on Queen Jewels, the 2004 Greatest Karaoke Hits DVD, and the Japanese release of the documentary Days of Our Lives.

Appearances in other media
The song has appeared in multiple television advertisements, mainly in Japan. The original version recorded by Mercury appeared in the TV commercial of Japanese cosmetics company Noevia in the mid 1980s. The Queen version was released as a single exclusively in Japan in February 1996, because the song was used in a TV ad for Kirin Ichiban Shibori, one of the best-selling liquors of the country produced by the Kirin Brewery Company. The single became their first song that entered the Japanese chart since "Teo Torriatte (Let Us Cling Together)", released in 1977.

In 1987, Brazilian singer Gretchen made a cover version.

In 2004, Queen's version was used as the theme for Pride,  the successful Japanese drama starring Takuya Kimura and Yūko Takeuchi. Jewels, Queen's tie-in compilation album released only in Japan, includes "I Was Born to Love You".

The song was used in episode 29 of Pretty Guardian Sailor Moon, during a competitive game of gym-class volleyball.

In Malaysia, Mercury's version, using a different mix, was used by Astro in TV advertisements to promote their coverage of the 2018 FIFA World Cup. The advertisement, commissioned by Astro through agency Dentsu LHS Malaysia and created by Pesona Pictures Indonesia, also have an unused version, which used Queen's version of the song.

Cover versions were released by Hannah Jones, Worlds Apart and Andrew W.K. in February 2011.

A cover version based on Queen's version is used in the fourth level of the Nintendo DS video game Elite Beat Agents.

In the 2018 film, Bohemian Rhapsody, Freddie Mercury can briefly be seen composing the song on his piano, before the Mr. Bad Guy montage.

Track listings 
7" single (1985)
A. "I Was Born to Love You" - 3:37
B. "Stop All the Fighting" - 3:17

12" single (1985)
A. "I Was Born to Love You" (Extended Version) - 7:03
B. "Stop All the Fighting" - 3:17

Personnel
Original version
Freddie Mercury - lead vocals, piano, synthesizer, Synclavier
Fred Mandel - synthesizer, rhythm guitar
Paul Vincent - lead guitar
Curt Cress - drums
Stephan Wissnet - bass guitar, Fairlight CMI
Reinhold Mack - Fairlight CMI, Synclavier II

Queen version
Freddie Mercury - lead and backing vocals, piano, keyboards
Brian May - electric guitar, keyboards
Roger Taylor - drums, percussion
John Deacon - bass guitar

Chart history 
Freddie Mercury version 

Queen version

Certifications

References

External links
 Lyrics at Queen official website

Freddie Mercury songs
Queen (band) songs
1985 singles
1985 songs
1996 singles
2004 singles
Oricon International Singles Chart number-one singles
Songs written by Freddie Mercury
Songs released posthumously
Japanese television drama theme songs
Dance-rock songs
Hard rock ballads
Song recordings produced by Reinhold Mack
Hollywood Records singles
Music videos directed by David Mallet (director)
Disco songs